William Michael Zadick (born April 3, 1973) is an American amateur wrestler. He won an NCAA college wrestling championship while competing with the University of Iowa and the 2006 World Wrestling Championships in freestyle wrestling.

International wrestling career
Bill Zadick was a resident athlete at the U.S. Olympic Training Center in Colorado Springs, Colorado, from 2004-2008. His intensive training there helped him reach the pinnacle of the international amateur wrestling ranks when he won the gold medal at 66 kg/145.5 pounds at the 2006 FILA Wrestling World Championships in Guangzhou, China. He won bronze at the 2007 Pan-American Championships.

Zadick's international wrestling career began in 1996, after he graduated from the University of Iowa. He competed in the 2001 World Championships, placing seventh. Zadick was the runner-up at 66 kg at the U.S. Olympic Team Trials in 2000 and 2008. He was a three-time U.S. Nationals finalist in 2003, 2006, and 2008, and a two-time World Team Trials runner-up in 1999 and 2002.

In 2021, Zadick was inducted into the National Wrestling Hall of Fame as a Distinguished Member.

College wrestling career
Zadick was a two-time All-American for the University of Iowa, where he was coached by the legendary Dan Gable. Zadick placed fifth at the 1995 NCAA national championships and capped his career at Iowa by winning the NCAA championship at 142 pounds in 1996. His collegiate career record was 87-13 with 16 pins, competing from 1993 to 1996 at 134 and 142 pounds.

He earned a bachelor's degree in art from Iowa in 1996.

High school wrestling career
Zadick wrestled at Great Falls High School, where he was coached by Tim Owens. He is one of only 37 wrestlers to win four Montana state championships, which he accomplished in four different weight classes: 98 pounds (1988), 112 pounds (1989), 119 pounds (1990), and 135 pounds (1991).

Coaching career
After retiring from competition in 2008, Zadick was named the Resident Coordinator and Assistant National Coach for USA Wrestling. He serves as the liaison between USA Wrestling and the U.S. Olympic Training Center in matters pertaining to USA Wrestling's resident athlete programs. Among his other duties are coordinating educational and professional development opportunities for the wrestling resident athletes, and assisting with coaching at resident and National Team practices. Zadick was instrumental in bringing 2013 Junior World gold medalist wrestler Kyle Snyder to the United States Olympic Training Center, and helped coached Kyle Snyder to a Junior World Championship in August 2013.

In June 2016, Zadick was named the head coach of the United States Senior Freestyle team, beginning after the 2016 Olympics. The following year, he won the USOC National Coach of the Year in 2017.

Personal information
Bill and his younger brother, Mike Zadick, are part of the University of Iowa's tradition of brothers competing for the Hawkeyes. Mike was a 2008 Olympian and the 2006 silver medalist at 132.25 pounds (60 kg). He was a three-time all-American for the Hawkeyes, winning a Big Ten title at 149 pounds in 2002. Mike is currently an assistant coach for the Iowa State University Cyclones.

Zadick is the son of Bob and Toni Zadick of Great Falls. He also has two sisters, Terri and MaryAnn. He lives in Colorado Springs, Colorado.

See also
List of World and Olympic Champions in Men's Freestyle Wrestling
United States results in Men's Freestyle Wrestling
Greco-Roman wrestling

References

Living people
1973 births
American male sport wrestlers